A ribbon or riband is a thin band of material, typically cloth but also plastic or sometimes metal, used primarily as decorative binding and tying. Cloth ribbons are made of natural materials such as silk, cotton, and jute and of synthetic materials, such as polyester, nylon, and polypropylene. Ribbon is used for useful, ornamental, and symbolic purposes. Cultures around the world use ribbon in their hair, around the body, and as ornament on non-human animals, buildings, and packaging. Some popular fabrics used to make ribbons are satin, organza, sheer, silk, velvet, and grosgrain.

Etymology
The word ribbon comes from Middle English ribban or riban from Old French ruban, which is probably of Germanic origin.

Cloth

Along with that of tapes, fringes, and other smallwares, the manufacture of cloth ribbons forms a special department of the textile industries. The essential feature of a ribbon loom is the simultaneous weaving in one loom frame of two or more webs, going up to as many as forty narrow fabrics in modern looms. To affect the conjoined throwing of all the shuttles and the various other movements of the loom, the automatic action of the power-loom is necessary, and it is a remarkable fact that the self-acting ribbon loom was known and extensively used more than a century before the famous invention of Cartwright. A loom in which several narrow webs could be woven at one time is mentioned as having been working in Dantzig towards the end of the 16th century. Similar looms were at work in Leiden in 1620, where their use gave rise to so much discontent and rioting on the part of the weavers that the states-general had to prohibit their use. The prohibition was renewed at various intervals throughout the century, and in the same interval the use of the ribbon loom was interdicted in most of the principal industrial centres of Europe. In 1676, under the name of the Dutch loom or engine loom, it was brought to London, and although its introduction there caused some disturbance, it does not appear to have been prohibited. In 1745, John Kay, the inventor of the fly-shuttle, obtained, conjointly with Joseph Stell, a patent for improvements in the ribbon loom. Since that period, it has benefited by the inventions applied to weaving machinery generally.

Ribbon-weaving is known to have been established near St. Etienne (dep. Loire) as early as the 11th century, and that town has remained the headquarters of the industry in Europe. During the Huguenot troubles, ribbon-weavers from St. Etienne settled at Basel, and there, established an industry which in modern times has rivalled that of the original seat of the trade.  In the late 19th century a Frenchman known as C.M. Offray— himself from St. Etienne— moved his ribbon business to the United States and set up a company called "C.M. Offray & Sons, Inc" which went on to become a huge manufacturer of ribbons in North America.  In Germany,  Krefeld is the centre of the ribbon industry; the manufacture of black velvet ribbon being a specialty. In England. Coventry is the most important seat of ribbon-making, which is also prosecuted at Norwich and Leicester.

While satin and other sorts of ribbon have always been used in lingerie, the usage of ribbon in the clothing industry, while subject to fashion trends, saw an upsurge in the mid to late 1990s. This upsurge led to increased ribbon manufacturing as well as new and improved manufacturing techniques. Due to more competitive production rates, as well as past experience in this field, companies in the Far East – especially those in China – gradually secured themselves to be the major ribbon suppliers in the world and improved both the quality and the variety of their merchandise to match those of their established European and North American competitors.

Presently, the North American continent remains the largest importer of ribbon and ribbon derivative  products (such as bows, rosettes, and other garment accessories made from ribbon). However, due to outsourcing of production of garments by North American garment manufacturers, countries in Asia and South America have started to contribute to the change of the statistical figures of ribbon imports. Inspired by European silk ribbons obtained through trade, Great Lakes and Prairie Native American tribes created art form of appliqué ribbon work.

For printers and typewriters

Typewriters and dot matrix printers use a cloth or plastic ribbon to hold the ink.

Symbolism
Pieces of ribbon are used as symbols of support or awareness for various social causes and are called "awareness ribbons". Ribbons are used in some ceremonies, such as in a ribbon cutting ceremony.

See also

 Award ribbon
 Awareness ribbon (e.g. Pink Ribbon)
 List of awareness ribbons
 Ribbon bar
 Ribbon cable

References

 
Notions (sewing)
Textile closures